Orizatlán (officially: San Felipe Orizatlán) is a town and one of the 84 municipalities of Hidalgo, in central-eastern Mexico. The municipal seat lies at Orizatlán. The municipality covers an area of 308 km².

As of 2005, the municipality had a total population of 38,472.

References

Municipalities of Hidalgo (state)
Populated places in Hidalgo (state)